Altaysky (masculine), Altayskaya (feminine), or Altayskoye (neuter) may refer to:
Altai Krai (Altaysky Krai), a federal subject of Russia
Altaysky District, name of several districts in Russia
Altaysky (rural locality) (Altayskaya, Altayskoye), name of several rural localities in Russia

See also
Altay (disambiguation)